Pehr is a predominantly Swedish language masculine give name and may refer to:

Pehr Adlerfelt (1680–1743), Swedish Army colonel 
Pehr von Afzelius (1760–1843), Swedish medical doctor and professor
Pehr Victor Edman (1916—1977), Swedish biochemist
Pehr von Ehrenheim (1823–1918), Swedish politician 
Pehr Forsskål (also known as Peter Forsskål; 1732–1763), Swedish-Finnish explorer, orientalist and naturalist
Pehr Götrek (1798–1876), Swedish Christian communist 
Pehr Gyllenhammar (1901–1988), Swedish businessman
Pehr G. Gyllenhammar (born 1935), Swedish businessman 
Pehr Harbury (born 1965), American biochemist
Pehr Hilleström (1732–1816), Swedish artist
Pehr Ferdinand Holm (1844–1917), Swedish-born New Zealand mariner
Pehr G. Holmes (1881–1952), Swedish-born American politician 
Pehr Hörberg (1746–1816), Swedish painter and musician
Pehr Janse (1893–1961), Swedish Army major general
Pehr Kalm  (1716–1779), Finnish explorer and naturalist
Pehr Henrik Ling (1776–1839), Swedish physical education teacher
Pehr Löfling (1729–1756), Swedish botanist
Pehr Magnebrant (born 1970), Swedish golfer
Pehr Henrik Nordgren (1944–2008), Finnish composer
Pehr Osbeck (1723–1805), Swedish explorer and naturalist
Pehr August Peterson (1846–1927), Swedish-born American businessman, civic leader and philanthropist
Pehr Qværnstrøm (1878–1949), Norwegian actor, film director and scriptwriter
Pehr Arvid Säve (1811–1887), Swedish teacher, cultural historian and artist
Pehr Evind Svinhufvud (1861–1944), Prime Minister and third President of Finland
Pehr Wilhelm Wargentin (1717–1783), Swedish astronomer and demographer

See also
Per
Pär
Peter
 

Masculine given names
Swedish masculine given names